The 2018 Cincinnati Bearcats football team represented the University of Cincinnati in the 2018 NCAA Division I FBS football season. The Bearcats play their home games at Nippert Stadium, and are members of the East Division in the American Athletic Conference. They are led by second-year head coach Luke Fickell.

Previous season 
In 2017, the Bearcats were led by first-year head coach Luke Fickell, who was hired to replace Tommy Tuberville. The Bearcats finished with a 4–8 (2–6 AAC) record, missing a bowl game for the second-straight season.

Recruits

The Bearcats signed a total of 23 recruits.

Incoming transfers
Cincinnati added five transfers to the 2018 roster.

Preseason

Award watch lists
Listed in the order that they were released

AAC media poll
The AAC media poll was released on July 24, 2018, with the Bearcats predicted to finish fourth in the AAC East Division.

Schedule 
The Bearcats' 2018 schedule will consist of six home games and six away games. Cincinnati will host two of its four non-conference games; against Alabama A&M from the Southwestern Athletic Conference, and Ohio from the Mid-American Conference.  They will take on long time rival Miami (OH) for their annual Victory Bell game at Paul Brown Stadium. They will travel to UCLA for the first ever meeting between the Bearcats and Bruins.

The Bearcats will play eight conference games; hosting East Carolina, Navy, South Florida and Tulane. They will travel to UCF, UConn, SMU, and Temple.

Game summaries

at UCLA 

Expected to be an easy warmup opponent in the UCLA debut of Chip Kelly, the Bearcats were rude guests stunning the double digit favorite Bruins in the Rose Bowl. Michael Warren II rushed for 141 yards and 3 touchdowns, as the Bearcats rallied from an early 10–0 deficit to win. The Bearcats clinching touchdown came after the Bruins were called for a penalty during a Bearcats field goal attempt leading 19–17. Bearcats head coach Luke Fickell boldly gambled that the Bearcats could convert a 4th and 1 deep in Bruins territory and accepted the penalty, which took the field goal off the board. The Bearcats converted the 4th down and Warren scored a touchdown a few plays later to ice the game.

vs. Miami (OH) 

Played in a steady downpour, the Bearcats ground out a 21–0 win over the RedHawks to retain possession of the Victory Bell for the 13th straight season. This was the Bearcats' first shutout since blanking the Redhawks in 2013. Utilizing a ground attack, the Bearcats were led by redshirt freshman Desmond Ridder who had 117 yards rushing, and Michael Warren II with 94 yards rushing and 2 touchdowns. Though the game was played in soggy conditions, there was only one turnover committed by both teams combined.  The game was played at Paul Brown Stadium in front of only 16,089 fans.

Alabama A&M 

In their home opener, The Bearcats scored on their first six possessions, led by Desmond Ridder's 9 for 10 passing and 3 touchdowns in the first quarter (the only quarter he played) as the Bearcats throttled the 1-AA Bulldogs. The Bearcats scored 49 points before the visitors from Huntsville could get a score.

Ohio 

The Bearcats rallied from a 7–24 deficit to defeat the Bobcats. James Wiggins' goal-line interception in the 4th quarter snuffed out a late Bobcat drive and sealed the win.

at UConn 

The Bearcats spotted the Huskies an opening touchdown then ripped off 49 unanswered points to win their conference opener. Desmond Ridder threw for 270 yards, two touchdowns and ran for another score as the Bearcats rolled up 659 yards on offense.

Tulane 

Michael Warren rushed for 123 yards including a career long 81 yarder for a touchdown that gave the Bearcats the lead for good, and it was a happy Homecoming as the Bearcats improved to 2–0 in conference. The Bearcats broke the game open by scoring 27 straight points between the 2nd and 4th quarters.  With the win, the Bearcats not only stayed unbeaten, they also became Bowl-eligible for the first time since 2015.

at Temple 

Ranked in the regular season for the first time since 2013, the Bearcats were now in the role of the hunted and it did not suit them well, as numerous late gaffes by the Bearcats allowed the Owls to rally from a 17-10 4th quarter deficit to win 24–17 in overtime. The Owls scored first in the extra session and Bearcats quarterback Desmond Ridder was intercepted to end the game. The loss was Cincinnati's third straight to Temple.

at SMU 

The Bearcats bounced back from their first loss to win a taut game in Dallas. Again the Bearcats raced out to a lead and again let the opponent rally back. The Bearcats were staked to a 17–7 lead in the third quarter from a pair of 32 yard Ridder to Kahlil Lewis touchdown passes and a Cole Smith field goal. The Mustangs rallied with 13 unanswered points in the third and fourth quarters to take a 20–17 lead. Smith's second field goal with no time left in regulation forced overtime. SMU had first possession in overtime when SMU quarterback Ben Hicks was intercepted by James Wiggins who returned the stolen pass 86 yards for a touchdown to give the Bearcats a walk-off win. Desmond Ridder threw for 352 yards and 2 touchdowns. The win avenged the homecoming loss to SMU from the previous season, ruining the Mustangs' homecoming in kind. The win moved the Bearcats to 7–1, their best start since the 2011 team also started 7–1.

Navy 

Cincinnati's previous meeting with Navy was a 42–32 loss, as the Bearcats could not slow much less stop the Midshipmen's triple option. This meeting, Navy's first ever in Cincinnati, the Bearcats were determined not to let the scenario repeat. Holding the Middies to 57 first half yards (all rushing) the Bearcats got a pair of touchdowns from Michael Warren II to go with a pair of touchdowns from Desmond Ridder (1 rush, 1 pass) as the Bearcats thrashed Navy 42–0, the Bearcats' second shutout of the season. The win moved the Bearcats to 8-1 their best start since 2009.

South Florida 

The Bearcats returned to nationally ranked status at 25 and this time did not squander its ranking. Michael Warren II scored 4 TDs as the Bearcats broke open a tight game in the third quarter and pulled away to a 35–23 win over South Florida. The Bearcats were trailing 16–14 in the third when Warren broke loose for a 57-yard touchdown run, his second of the day after catching a touchdown pass from Desmond Ridder. Warren would add two more scores in the third quarter and finish with 151 rushing yards. The win moved Cincinnati to 9-1 and set up a showdown with defending conference champ University of Central Florida. It was announced shortly after the game that the matchup with UCF the upcoming Saturday would not only be nationally televised as the College Football Saturday Night Game of the Week on ABC, but also be the focus of the ESPN College Gameday.

at UCF 

With its highest regular season ranking (19) in seven years, the Bearcats traveled to Orlando to face unbeaten and 11th ranked UCF. In front a rowdy Spectrum Stadium crowd and a nationally televised audience, the Bearcats started strong. A Kimoni Fitz strip-sack/fumble in the end zone gave the Bearcats a 6–0 lead and quieted the UCF crowd, but Cole Smith missed the extra point and the Knights promptly raced back down the field to take the lead on McKenzie Milton's short run. The Knights were never headed again, scoring 35 straight points and rolling to a 38–13 win. The Bearcat offense never got on track and the Knights clinched the AAC Eastern Division title.

East Carolina 

Desmond Ridder threw for 335 yards and four touchdowns in the first half as the Bearcats steamrolled the Pirates on Senior Day 56–6. Khalil Lewis finished with a career high 202 yards on 9 catches and 3 touchdowns. With top running back Michael Warren sidelined with a shoulder injury, Charles McClelland filled in capably with 114 yards rushing which included a 55-yard touchdown run in the second quarter. The Bearcats scored the game's first 35 points and were never threatened. The defense got in on the scoring as well with Arquon Bush intercepting a fourth quarter pass and taking the stolen loaf 36 yards back for the game's final score. The 56 points marked the fourth time this season the Bearcats topped 40 points in a game. The Bearcats honored 14 seniors, who were sent out with a home finale win before a Thanksgiving Friday afternoon crowd.  With this win, Cincinnati completed its first unbeaten home schedule since 2009, and its first double-digit win season since 2012. The 10 wins before the bowl game was the most since the 2009 team completed an unbeaten 12–0 season.
The Bearcats accepted a bid from the Military Bowl against Virginia Tech, their first bowl bid since the 2015 season and looked to claim their first bowl win since the 2012 Belk Bowl.

vs. Virginia Tech (Military Bowl) 

The Bearcats won their first bowl game since the 2012 Belk Bowl and avenged a previous Military Bowl loss to the Hokies with a thrilling win. Michael Warren's 8 yard touchdown run in the fourth quarter proved to be the winning score. The game was not sealed until James Wiggins' acrobatic interception at his own 30 late in the fourth quarter. The University of Cincinnati Bearcats completed their best season since 2011 and finished in the national rankings 23rd in the Coaches poll and 24th in the AP Poll.

Personnel

Roster and staff

Depth chart

Rankings

Awards and milestones

2019 NFL Draft

The following Bearcat player was selected in the 2019 NFL Draft.

References

Cincinnati
Cincinnati Bearcats football seasons
Military Bowl champion seasons
Cincinnati Bearcats football